The 1986 Dutch Open was a Grand Prix men's tennis tournament staged in Hilversum, Netherlands. The tournament was played on outdoor clay courts and was held from 28 July until 3 August 1986. It was the 29th edition of the tournament. Seventh-seeded Thomas Muster, who entered on a wildcard, won the singles title.

Finals

Singles
 Thomas Muster defeated  Jakob Hlasek 6–1, 6–3, 6–3

Doubles
 Miloslav Mečíř /  Tomáš Šmíd defeated  Tom Nijssen /  Johan Vekemans 6–4, 6–2

References

External links
 ITF – tournament edition details

Dutch Open (tennis)
Dutch Open (tennis)
Dutch Open
Dutch Open
Dutch Open
Dutch Open (tennis), 1986